Heo Jang-gang (May 9, 1925 – September 21, 1975) was a South Korean actor, one of the representative actors in the 1960s and 1970s. He mainly took supporting roles such as villains or comical characters. He died of a heart attack after playing football in 1975.

His sons Heo Gi-ho and Heo Joon-ho also became actors.

Filmography
*Note; the whole list is referenced.

Awards and nominations
1966 the 4th Blue Dragon Film Awards : Best Supporting Actor for A Hero without Serial Number (Gunbeon-eobsneun Yongsa)
1972 the 8th Baeksang Arts Awards : Best Actor for Bun-Rye's story (Bunlyegi)
1974 the 13th Grand Bell Awards : Best Supporting Actor for A flowery bier(Kkochsang-yeo)
1975 the 14th Grand Bell Awards : Special Achievement Award

See also 

 List of South Korean male actors
 Cinema of Korea

References

External links 

1925 births
1975 deaths
Male actors from Seoul
South Korean male film actors
20th-century South Korean male actors